Daniel Murlin Nester (born February 29, 1968 in Portsmouth, Virginia) is an American writer, editor, and poet.

Biography
Nester was raised in  Maple Shade Township, New Jersey. He attended high school at Camden Catholic High School in Cherry Hill, New Jersey, and college at Rutgers University-Camden. He is currently an Assistant Professor of English at The College of Saint Rose, in Albany, New York, where he also curates the popular Frequency North reading series.

Non-fiction
Nester is the author of two books about the musical group Queen, and his obsession with them: God Save My Queen: A Tribute  and God Save My Queen II: The Show Must Go On. His other nonfiction work has appeared in numerous anthologies on gaming, poetry, and rock and roll.

Poetry
His first book of poetry is The History of My World Tonight. His poetry has appeared in jubilat, Crazyhorse, Open City, Slope, Spoon River Poetry Review, Best American Poetry 2003, Poets & Writers, Time Out New York, and Bookslut.

Editing and publishing
Nester published and edited the now-defunct online journal Unpleasant Event Schedule, and served as Assistant Web Editor for Sestinas for McSweeney’s. In the past he has edited for La Petite Zine, Ducky and Painted Bride Quarterly. He also served as editor and wrote the foreword to ''Words In Your Face: A Guided Tour Through Twenty Years of the New York City Poetry Slam Movement."

References

External links
Daniel Nester's web page

American male poets
American magazine editors
Poets from New Jersey
Poets from New York (state)
People from Maple Shade Township, New Jersey
Living people
1968 births
Rutgers University alumni
New York University alumni
College of Saint Rose
American male non-fiction writers
21st-century American poets
People from Portsmouth, Virginia
Poets from Virginia
20th-century American poets
20th-century American male writers
21st-century American male writers
American writers about music
21st-century American non-fiction writers